Musical Merry-Go-Round is an NBC TV series which aired from July 25, 1947, to 1949. The series featured live music performances.

Production history
Each 30-minute episode was hosted by Jack Kilty, "who sat in front of the camera and played records." Little else is known about this early television series. 

Musical Merry-Go-Round was an early innovative and pioneering effort to do music videos on TV. It was renamed from its predecessor, a groundbreaking series called Disc Magic. Martin Block, the orchestra leader, hosted as one of the emcees presenting musical performances.

See also
1947-48 United States network television schedule (Thursdays at 8:30pm ET)
1948-49 United States network television schedule (Fridays at 7:30pm ET)

References

External links
 

1947 American television series debuts
1949 American television series endings
NBC original programming
American music television series
Black-and-white American television shows
English-language television shows